The badminton men's doubles tournament at the 2018 Asian Games in Jakarta took place from 23 to 28 August at Istora Gelora Bung Karno.

The Indonesian duo of Marcus Fernaldi Gideon and Kevin Sanjaya Sukamuljo won the gold in this tournament.

Schedule
All times are Western Indonesia Time (UTC+07:00)

Results

Final

Top half

Bottom half

References

External links
Schedule

Men's doubles